Dreamland is an album by the American jazz group Yellowjackets, released in 1995. The album reached a peak position of number twelve on Billboard Top Contemporary Jazz Albums chart.

Track listing

Personnel 
Yellowjackets
 Russell Ferrante – keyboards
 Jimmy Haslip –  bass, shop bass
 Will Kennedy – drums
 Bob Mintzer – saxophones, bass clarinet, Bb clarinet, horn arrangements (5)

Guest Musicians
 John Lehmkuhl – additional programming 
 Luis Conte – percussion (1, 4)
 Bobby McFerrin – percussion (3), vocals (3)
 Chuck Findley – trumpet (1, 5, 7), trombone (5)

Production 
 Yellowjackets – producers 
 Malcolm Pollack – engineer 
 Rich Breen – additional engineer, vocal recording (3)
 Will Kennedy – additional engineer
 Richard Landers – assistant engineer
 Jeff Shannon – assistant engineer
 Brett Swain – assistant engineer
 Greg Calbi – mastering 
 Sally G. Poppe – production coordinator 
 Kim Briggs – art direction, design
 Lynn Green Root – illustration
 Caroline Greyshock – photography

Studios
 Recorded at O'Henry Sound Studios (Burbank, California).
 Mastered at The Mastering Lab (Hollywood, California).

Charts

References

1995 albums
Yellowjackets albums
Warner Records albums
Instrumental albums